In the United States of America, majority-minority area or minority-majority area is a term describing a U.S. state or jurisdiction whose population is composed of less than 50% non-Hispanic whites. Racial data is derived from self-identification questions on the U.S. Census and on U.S. Census Bureau estimates. (See Race and ethnicity in the United States Census). The term is often used in voting rights law to designate voting districts that are designed under the Voting Rights Act to enable ethnic or language minorities "the opportunity to elect their candidate of choice." In that context, the term was first used by the Supreme Court in 1977. The Court had previously used the term in employment discrimination and labor relations cases.

Six states are majority-minority as of July 2019: Hawaii, New Mexico, California, Texas, Nevada, and Maryland.
Washington, D.C. and all populated United States territories (Puerto Rico, Guam, the U.S. Virgin Islands, the Northern Mariana Islands, and American Samoa) are also majority-minority. None of the United States territories ever had a white majority.
As of 2011, minority births (children under age 1) are the majority among births nationwide.
As of 2017, minority children comprise the majority among children in fourteen states: the six that are already majority-minority, plus the following eight: Arizona, Florida, Georgia, New Jersey, Delaware, Alaska, New York, and Mississippi.
As of 2019, children are majority minority nationwide.
Per the 2020 United States Census, the percentage of non-Hispanic white residents is below 60% in seventeen states: the six that are already majority-minority, plus the following eleven: Georgia (50.1%), Florida (51.5%), New Jersey (51.9%), New York (52.5%), Arizona (53.4%), Mississippi (55.4%), Louisiana (55.8%), Alaska (57.5%), Illinois (58.3%), Delaware (58.6%), and Virginia (58.6%).
The whole United States of America is projected to become majority-minority by the middle of the 21st century if current trends continue. The U.S. will then become the first major post-industrial society in the world where the dominant group established in an earlier period transitioned from majority to minority under the influence of changing demographics. With alternate immigration scenarios, the whole United States is projected to become majority-minority sometime between 2041 and 2046 (depending on the amount of net immigration into the U.S., birth/death rates, and intermarriage rates over the preceding years).

States 
From colonial times to the early-twentieth century, much of the Deep South had a black majority. Three Southern states had populations that were majority-black: Louisiana (from 1810 until about 1890), South Carolina (until the 1920s), and Mississippi (from the 1830s to the 1930s.)

In the same period, Georgia, Alabama, and Florida had populations that were nearly 50% black.

Maryland, North Carolina, and Virginia had black populations approaching or exceeding 40%. Texas's black population reached 30%.

The demographics of these states changed markedly from the 1890s through the 1960s, as two waves of the Great Migration resulted in more than 6,500,000 African Americans to abandon the economically depressed, segregated Deep South in search of better employment opportunities and living conditions, first in Northern and Midwestern industrial cities, and later west to California. One-fifth of Florida's black population had left the state by 1940, for instance. During the last thirty years of the twentieth century into the twenty-first century, scholars have documented a reverse New Great Migration of black people to southern states, but typically to urban destinations in the New South, which have pleasant climates and developing economies.

Washington, D.C. was one of the magnets for black people during the Great Migration, and reached a majority-black status during the migration's latter stages. The black proportion has declined since the 1990s due to gentrification and expanding opportunities elsewhere, with some leaving the district because of rising housing costs or for opportunities in the South. Many black people have moved to Maryland, Georgia, Florida, and Texas. They are joined by others migrating to jobs in states of the New South in a reverse of the Great Migration. Per the 2020 Census, the Black population represented 40.9% of the D.C. population — a considerable decline from 75% in the late-1970s. At the same time, Asian and Hispanic populations have increased in the District, and it is still classified as a majority-minority area.

Since 1965, changes in the origin of foreign immigration have resulted in increases in the number of majority-minority areas, most notably in California. Its legal resident population was 89.5% 'non-Hispanic white' in the 1940s, but by 2020, was 34.7% 'non-Hispanic white'.

In 2010, minority children comprised the majority among children in the six states that were already majority-minority, plus the following four: Arizona, Florida, Georgia, and Mississippi.

Hawaii is the only state to have never had a non-Hispanic white majority. In addition, all populated United States territories have never had a non-Hispanic white majority.

Cities 
Many cities in the United States became majority-minority by 2010. Out of the top 15 cities by population, Columbus, Ohio is the only city not classified as majority-minority.

As of 2012, 50 metropolitan areas in the U.S. are majority-minority.

As of 2015, 12% of U.S. counties are majority-minority.

Data collection 
The first data for New Mexico was a 5% sample in 1940, which estimated non-Hispanic whites at 50.9%. Hispanics are not classified as a race, according to the U.S. census, but as an ethnic and cultural group of any race. Of respondents who listed Hispanic origin, some identified as being of the White race, roughly half gave responses tabulated under "Some other race" (e.g. giving a national origin such as "Mexican" or a designation such as "Mestizo" as race), and much smaller numbers listed Black, American Indian, or Asian as their race.

In U.S. censuses since 1990, self-identification by respondents has been the primary way to identify race of residents. Presumption of race based on countries or regions given in the ancestry question is used only when a respondent has answered the ancestry question but not the race question. The U.S. Census defines "White people" very broadly as "people having origins in any of the original peoples of Europe, the Middle East, or North Africa, i.e. Caucasoid. This definition has changed through the years.

Although the census attempts to enumerate both citizens and non-citizens, the undocumented immigrant population of the United States has proven hard to quantify; the census uses a 12 million base estimate nationally.

Maps and graphs

Majority-minority counties in the United States by state

Institutions 
In the United States for the 2018/2019 school year, 78.7% of white public school students attended schools where they are the majority, compared to 55.9% of Hispanics, 42.0% of African Americans, and 14.3% of Asians. At a national level in the US with regards to racial classification, public schools obtained majority minority status in 2014.

Other uses 

Normally, a state is classified as majority-minority because of the ethnic or racial makeup of residents, but other criteria are occasionally used, such as religion, disability, or age. For example, the majority of Utah residents are members of the Church of Jesus Christ of Latter-day Saints, a Christian denomination that is a religious minority throughout the rest of the United States. In addition to Utah, Rhode Island and Louisiana, which have Roman Catholic majorities, are the only states in the U.S. where a single denomination constitutes a majority of the population. (By contrast, numerous denominations are classified as Protestant.) But, no U.S. state has a majority composed of any non-Christian group, except for Hawaii, where 51.1% of the population follow religions that would be non-mainstream in the rest of the United States. Hawaii is classified as religious majority of Unaffiliated, including agnostics, atheists, humanists, the irreligious, and secularists (non-practicing).

Criticism 
In January 2016, CUNY sociologist Richard Alba wrote an article in The American Prospect arguing that the way in which majority-minority calculations are made by the Census are misleading. Anyone identifying as of Hispanic, Asian, or Black ancestry is classified as non-white, although they may also have white ancestry. Alba argues that the incomes, marriage patterns, and social identities of people of who are mixed Hispanic-white and Asian-white are closer to those of white people than monoracial Hispanics or Asians. Thus, when the Census says that non-Hispanic whites are projected to be less than 50% of the population by the 2040s, people of mixed-race ancestry are improperly excluded from that category.

See also
List of majority minority United States congressional districts
Lists of U.S. cities with non-white majority populations
List of U.S. states by non-Hispanic white population

References

External links
 U.S. Census demographic estimates
 10% of U.S. Counties Now 'Majority-Minority'

Demographics of the United States
Majority–minority relations
Majority-minority counties in the United States